Peter Jost Huber (born 25 March 1934) is a Swiss statistician. He is known for his contributions to the development of heteroscedasticity-consistent standard errors.

A native of Wohlen, Aargau, Huber earned his Ph.D. at the ETH Zürich in 1962, under supervision of Beno Eckmann. He later changed his research area from topology to statistics. In 2012, he became one of the inaugural fellows of the American Mathematical Society.

See also
 Huber loss
 M-estimator

References

External links 
 

1934 births
Living people
Swiss statisticians
ETH Zurich alumni
Fellows of the American Mathematical Society
Mathematical statisticians
People from Aargau